Major C. Mead (1858–1925) was a member of the Wisconsin State Senate.

Biography
Mead was born on June 26, 1858 in Lyndon, Sheboygan County, Wisconsin as the son of Abel Mead and Permelia Peck . His father died when he was 1 year old, and in 1863 his mother remarried his father's younger brother Clark R. Mead.  On June 29, 1881, Mead married Rose Robinson (1859–1951). They moved to Plymouth, Wisconsin and had three children. Mead died on February 19, 1925, and is interred at the Union Cemetery in Plymouth.

Career
Mead was elected to the Senate in 1888 and remained a member until 1892. He was a Democrat.

References

1858 births
1925 deaths
People from Plymouth, Wisconsin
Democratic Party Wisconsin state senators
People from Lyndon, Sheboygan County, Wisconsin